The 1887 Forest of Dean by-election was held on 29 July 1887 after the retirement of the incumbent Liberal MP Thomas Blake.  The seat was retained by the Liberal candidate Godfrey Blundell Samuelson.

References 

By-elections to the Parliament of the United Kingdom in Gloucestershire constituencies
Forest of Dean
July 1887 events
1887 elections in the United Kingdom
1887 in England
19th century in Gloucestershire